KS Szarotka Nowy Targ is a floorball club based in Nowy Targ, Poland. They are 9-time Ekstraliga Champions, winning the Ekstraliga every year since 2000. KS Szarotka maintain a strong rivalry with the other floorball team from their city, KS Górale Nowy Targ.

KS Szarotka, as winners of the Polish Floorball League, took part in the 2008 EuroFloorball Cup. They were narrowly defeated in qualifying by SK Latvijas Avīze, and knocked out of competition, missing qualification to the finals by one goal.

Roster
Updated 31 August 2008

External links
KS Szarotka Nowy Targ – Facebook

Floorball in Poland
Polish floorball teams
Nowy Targ County